Face Value is a 1983 anthology of collected journalism by South African journalist Jani Allan. The book is compiled from selections of Allan's successful gossip and popular culture column  Just Jani that appeared in the Sunday Times. She was voted "the most admired person in South Africa." in a Gallup poll commissioned by the newspaper. The book was published by Longstreet publishers in Cape Town and released in South Africa in 1983.

Synopsis
The book is a selection of interviews and photographs of public figures from various fields such as entertainment, sport, business, art and politics. Allan also contributed a column-style introduction to each chapter. Andrzej Sawa provided the photographs of the interviewees.

Five of the interviewees (Sol Kerzner, Danie Craven, Pieter-Dirk Uys, Walter Battiss and Taubie Kushlick) were featured in the They shaped our century survey, a top 100 list published about which people had the greatest influence on South Africa during the twentieth century. Sunday Times editor, Tertius Myburgh wrote a foreword for the collection.

Author's note
"I do not think that for one moment that in a brief interview I can write an accurate-every-time character-revealing piece. But my aim has always been to convey as honestly as I can my first impressions on FACE VALUE, with no 'Ums', 'Ers' or retakes."

Reception
The book received favourable reviews;

"She soon developed a highly individual style and the Jani Allan column, one of the most successful features in Africa's biggest newspaper, followed. She's become a formidable journalist...There's a touch of Tom Wolfe's 'new journalism' about her writing, but it is never contrived. In her choice of subjects she's attracted by what she calls 'the boquet of money' and she's good on those ubiquitous creatures of our time, the 'celebrities', whom she is able to send up without the bitchiness which tends to put me off some lady writers of the adversary school of journalism. When she's touched by something - an individual, a cause, or some little act of valour - her writing reflects immense warmth and humanity."   Tertius Myburgh, Editor of the Sunday Times

"Your piece on me acted like a bicycle pump and I mooned around for ages, smiling foolishly and cannoning off the wallls. [sic]"   Frank Muir

"The only girl who ever knocked me out"  Mike Weaver

"Guy Fawkes couldn't brighten up Sunday better."  Graham Bell

"She is not destructive - but she does have a particular facility for puncturing pomposity"  Joe Sutton

Contents
THE PERPETUAL SPECTACLES 9
Taubie Kushlick 11
Joan Brickhill & Louis Burke 13
Moira Lister 17
Diane Todd 19

BUSINESS MORE THAN USUAL 21
Sol Kerzner 22
Benny Goldberg 26
Mike Illion 29
Tony Factor 33

NATIONAL MONUMENTS 37
Dr Daniel Hartman Craven 29
Jamie Uys 41
Siegfried Mynhardt 44
Patrick Mynhardt 47
Joe Stewardson 51
Sonja Herholdt 53

PRETTY BOYS ALL IN A ROW 57
Richard Loring 58
Karl Kikillus 60
James Ryan 62

FUNNY YOU SHOULD SAY THAT ... 67
Tobie Cronje 69
Robert Kirby 70
Katinka Heyns 72
Pieter-Dirk Uys 75

SPORTING CHANCERS 79
Naas Botha 80
Raymond Rhodes 83
Wynand Classen 85

OLD MASTERS, YOUNG IDEAS 89
Walter Battiss 90
Gordon Vorster 93
Tretchikoff 95

MIXED METAPHORS 101
John Brett Cohen 103
The Hell's Angels 105
Alvon Collinson 109
Gunter Brözel 111
Robert Van Tonder 114
Carole Charlewood 118

Dictionary
Her Just Jani column has been referenced extensively by South African English dictionaries because of Allan's popular use of terms such as jorl, smaak and larney 
.

References

Books by Jani Allan
1983 non-fiction books
Books of interviews
South African non-fiction books
Books of photographs